Facundo Bonifazi Castro (born 29 September 1995) is a Uruguayan footballer who plays as a defender for Uruguayan club Defensor Sporting in the Primera División.

Career

MVV Maastricht
On 8 August 2019, Bonifazi joined Dutch Eerste Divisie club MVV Maastricht on a two-year contract.

References

External links

1995 births
Living people
Racing Club de Montevideo players
MVV Maastricht players
Club Atlético River Plate (Montevideo) players
Uruguayan Primera División players
Eerste Divisie players
Uruguayan footballers
Uruguayan expatriate footballers
Uruguayan expatriate sportspeople in the Netherlands
Expatriate footballers in the Netherlands
Association football defenders